Cidade Baixa (meaning Lower City) is a neighborhood of the city of Porto Alegre, the state capital of Rio Grande do Sul in Brazil. The neighborhood was created by the law number 2022 of December 7, 1959.

Nowadays Cidade Baixa is the main nightlife neighborhood of Porto Alegre. There are several bars and nightclubs particularly along the streets General Lima e Silva, República and João Alfredo. It is located next to the Farroupilha Park (also known as Redenção Park), one of the greenest areas in the city. Also, the proximity to the downtown Campus of the Federal University of Rio Grande do Sul (UFRGS) attracts many students, intellectuals and artists.

Population: 19.838,71 (2010 census)
Area: 210 hectares
Density: 79,21 hab/ha/km²
Number of housing units: 7,821

Historical Background 
Settlement in this region, located to the south of the former Altos da Matriz, began at the end of the 18th century, when Arvoredo Street was founded. In 1845, República Street and Venâncio Aires Avenue were stablished. In 1856, the Municipal Chamber proposed a new street layout of a large part of the region, considering the rapid growth of the population in the area. However, the plans did not materialize, and much of Cidade Baixa remained uninhabited for several years, especially the stretch of the former Areal da Baronesa, between the current streets Venâncio Aires and República.The implementation of animal-drawn tram lines on Caminho da Azenha and Margem Street contributed to the urbanization of the site. As of 1880, new streets were founded, such as Lopo Gonçalves, Luiz Afonso and Joaquim Nabuco. From that point onwards, urbanization grew, the neighborhood acquired a bohemian character and started to grow to its current formation.

Modern Limits 
The starting and ending point is where Praia de Belas Av. meets Aureliano de Figueiredo Pinto Av.; from there walk down Aureliano de Figueiredo Pinto Av. to Garibaldi Square, than to Venâncio Aires Av., until reaching João Pessoa Av. From there, walk down to Avenida Loureiro da Silva, along that to Avenida Borges de Medeiros, back to Praia de Belas Av., the starting point.

Cidade Baixa is limited by the Historic Distric, Praia de Belas, Menino Deus, Azenha and Farroupilha.

Landmarks 

 Green areas

 Largo Zumbi dos Palmares 
 Canon Marcelino Square
 Laurentino Zottis Square
 Professor Saint-Pastous Square

 Education

 State Elementary School Rio de Janeiro 
 State Elementary School Prof. Olintho de Oliveira
 State Elementary School Profª. Leopolda Barnewitz 
 Institute Pão dos Pobres 

 Culture

 Tao Cultural Center 
 Joaquim José Felizardo Museum 
 Bar Opinião

See also
Neighborhoods of Porto Alegre

References

External links
Porto Alegre Homepage
Bairros Porto Alegre - Nosbairros
Porto Alegre Official Map - Cidade Baixa

Neighbourhoods in Porto Alegre
Populated places established in 1959